Girolamo Abos, last name also given Avos or d'Avossa and baptized Geronimo Abos (16 November 1715 – May 1760), was a Maltese-Italian composer of both operas and church music.

Born in Valletta, Malta, son of Gian Tommaso Abos, whose father was a Frenchman from Castellane and Rosa Farrugia, Abos studied under Leonardo Leo and Francesco Durante in Naples. In 1756, he became Maestro al Cembalo (Director of Music) at the Italian Theatre in London. In 1758 he returned to Italy as a teacher at the Conservatorio della Pietà de' Turchini in Naples, where Giovanni Paisiello was one of his pupils. He wrote fourteen operas for the opera houses in Naples, Rome, and London, of which Tito Manlio (Naples, 1751) was the most successful. After 1758 he composed a good deal of church music, including seven masses and several litanies. He died in Naples. Many of his sacred works, oratorios, and the opera Pelopida have been edited by the Australian musicologist and conductor Richard Divall, and are freely available.

List of operas composed by Abos

References
Stabat Mater Gerolamo Abos ed. Joseph Vella Bondin Recent Researches in the Music of the Classical Era, 68, A-R Editions, Inc., Middleton, Wisconsin 2003, .

 Hanns-Bertold Dietz, Joseph Vella Bondin, "Abos, Girolamo ", The New Grove Dictionary of Music and Musicians, Second Edition (London: Macmillan, 2001). .

External links

Classical composers of church music
18th-century Italian male musicians
Italian Baroque composers
Italian male classical composers
Italian opera composers
Male opera composers
Maltese Baroque composers
Maltese classical composers
People from Valletta
18th-century Italian composers
1715 births
1760 deaths